Arjola is a given name. Notable people with the name include:

Arjola Dedaj (born 1981), Italian athlete
Arjola Trimi (born 1987), Italian swimmer